"Lisztomania" is a song by the French band Phoenix from their fourth album Wolfgang Amadeus Phoenix. It is their second single from the album, although a music video of the song was released before "1901". The music video shows them walking around Bayreuth, Germany, inside and outside the Franz Liszt Museum, Wahnfried, the Bayreuth Festspielhaus, sitting inside the Festspiel Theatre, performing live and going outside to find a blimp like the one shown on the album cover. The song helped the album to be their most successful following their previous hit, "1901".

It peaked at #11 on the Bubbling Under Hot 100 Singles chart in the US and as well as #15 in Belgium. Phoenix released a remix edition of the album later in 2009, with two of the tracks being "Lisztomania" remixes by Alex Metric and 25 Hrs a Day. The song came in at #4 in the Triple J Hottest 100, 2009, making Phoenix the first French band to finish in the top 5 of the Hottest 100.

Etymology 
The term Lisztomania was used by Heinrich Heine to describe the intense fan frenzy directed toward Franz Liszt during his performances. The video to the song shows the band visiting the Franz-Liszt-Museum in Bayreuth.

In popular culture
"Lisztomania" (Alex Metric Remix) was featured in Gran Turismo for PlayStation Portable. The song was also featured in the season 6 finale of the HBO series Entourage and in episodes of The Inbetweeners.

A classical rendition of "Lisztomania", performed and arranged by Roger Neill, is featured as the opening theme to the Amazon Original Series Mozart in the Jungle, and also appears in the end credits to the program's third episode, "Silent Symphony".

"Lisztomania" is used in the 2018 video game Life Is Strange 2.

The song was the soundtrack of a 2009 video meme that featured individuals reenacting the dance scene from the 1985 film The Breakfast Club. One video created by Boston University students gained new attention in 2019 due to the presence of future U.S. Representative Alexandria Ocasio-Cortez.

In law 
In August 2013, Lawrence Lessig brought suit against Liberation Music PTY Ltd., after Liberation issued a takedown notice of one of Lessig's lectures on YouTube which had used the song by Phoenix, whom Liberation Music represents. Lessig sought damages under section 512(f) of the Digital Millennium Copyright Act, which holds parties liable for misrepresentations of infringement or removal of material. Lessig was represented by the Electronic Frontier Foundation and Jones Day. In February 2014 the case ended with a settlement in which Liberation Music admitted wrongdoing in issuing the takedown notice, issued an apology, and paid a confidential sum in compensation.

Track listing 
Side A
 "Lisztomania" – 4:08
 "Lisztomania" (Alex Metric Remix) – 5:05
Side B
 "Lisztomania" (Yuksek Remix) – 5:08
 "Lisztomania" (A Fight for Love/25 Hours a Day Remix)

Charts

Weekly charts

Year-end charts

References

External links

Songs about musicians
Songs about classical music
Phoenix (band) songs
2009 singles
2009 songs
V2 Records singles
Songs written by Thomas Mars
Songs written by Laurent Brancowitz
Franz Liszt
Internet memes introduced in 2019
Disco songs